Anikó Für is a Hungarian actress.  She has had a lengthy career on  stage in classic and contemporary roles, and also performs on television and in film, including 1991's Paths of Death and Angels.

She is also a prolific voice actor, dubbing the Hungarian versions of English-language films.

External links 
 

1964 births
Living people
Hungarian film actresses
Hungarian stage actresses
Hungarian television actresses
Hungarian voice actresses